Runemagick is a Swedish death/doom band formed in 1990. The band was started by Nicklas "Terror" Rudolfsson under the name Desiderius, which was quickly changed to Runemagic. First, the band consisted solely of Rudolfsson, but he was later joined by Robert "Reaper" Pehrsson. They started out as a pure death metal band but later incorporated doom metal influences, inspired by the likes of Bathory, Treblinka/Tiamat, Celtic Frost, Nihilist/Entombed, and Candlemass.

After a few demos the band fell apart in 1993. Rudolfsson restored Runemagic in 1997 with Fredrik Johnsson on guitar and Peter Palmdahl on bass; he also added the "k" to the name (see also magick). A rehearsal demo with Nicklas on drums was recorded and sent to Century Media Records, which got them a record deal for three albums. After many line-up changes, in 2000, the band parted with Century Media and eventually landed on the Norwegian label Aftermath Music.

After the album Dawn of the End (2007) the band went into a long hiatus but resumed in 2017. In 2018, the band recorded and released a new album, Evoked From Abysmal Sleep, released by Aftermath Music, Parasitic Records and Flowing Downwards. The band also played live first the first time since 2005 at Kill-Town Deathfest in Copenhagen, Denmark.

Members
Current
 Nicklas Rudolfsson - guitar (1990–present), vocals (1997–present), drums (1990–1993), bass (1990–1992)
 Emma Rudolfsson - bass (2000–present)
 Daniel Moilanen - drums (2000–present)
Jonas Blom - guitar (2018–present)

Former
 Robert "Reaper" Pehrsson - guitar, (1991–1992), vocals (1991–1993)
 Johan Norman (session/touring) - guitar (1992–1993)
 Alex Losbäck - bass (touring/session member) (1992–1993)
 Fredrik Johnsson - guitar (1997–2003)
 Peter Palmdahl - bass (1997–1998)
 Tomas Eriksson - guitar (2002–2003)
 Jonas Blom - drums (1998)
 Johan Bäckman - bass (1993)

Timeline

Discography

Studio albums
 The Supreme Force of Eternity (1998)
 Enter the Realm of Death (1999)
 Resurrection in Blood (2000)
 Requiem of the Apocalypse (2002)
 Moon of the Chaos Eclipse (2002)
 Darkness Death Doom (2003)
 On Funeral Wings (2004)
 Envenom (2005)
 Invocation of Magick (2006)
 Dawn of the End (2007)
 Evoked From Abysmal Sleep (2018)
 Into Desolate Realms (2019)
 Beyond the Cenotaph of Mankind (2023)

EPs
 Ancient Incantations (2001)
 Moon of the Chaos Eclipse (2002)
 Black Magick Sorceress (2005)
 Bound in Magick Haze (2015)
 The Opening of Dead Gates (2019)

Live albums
 Dark Live Magick (2001)
 Darkness Death Doom (2003)

References 

Musical groups established in 1990
Swedish doom metal musical groups
Swedish death metal musical groups
Swedish musical trios
Century Media Records artists

